Evgenia Melnik (born September 3, 1988 in Minsk) is a Belarusian figure skater. She currently competes in ice dancing with partner Oleg Krupen. She previously competed as a single skater until the end of the 2005/2006 season.

Competitive highlights
(single skating)
2005/2006
 Nebelhorn Trophy - 19th
 Ondrej Nepela Memorial - 21st
2004/2005
 European Championships - 32nd
 World Championships - 18th-Q
 Belarusian Championships - 1st
 Ukrainian Souvenir - 20th
2003/2004
 Junior Worlds - 24th
 Belarusian Championships - 1st
 Warsaw Cup - 1st J.
 Czech Skate - 16
2002/2003
 Junior Worlds - 22nd
 Belarusian Championships - 1st
2001/2002
 Belarusian Championships - 2nd
 European Youth Olympic Days - 13th

(Ice dancing)
2006/2007
 European Championships -  27th
 Winter Universiade - 12th
 Belarusian Championships - 1st

External links
 
 

Belarusian female ice dancers
Belarusian female single skaters
1988 births
Figure skaters at the 2007 Winter Universiade
Living people
Figure skaters from Minsk